Alfredo Gutiérrez Urías (born December 29, 1995) is a Mexican professional American football offensive tackle for the San Francisco 49ers of the National Football League (NFL). He played college football at the Monterrey Institute of Technology and joined the 49ers in 2021 as a part of the NFL's International Player Pathway Program (IPPP).

Early life and college career 

Alfredo Gutiérrez Urías was born in Tijuana, Mexico, on December 29, 1995. He attended Montgomery High School in San Diego. He attended Grossmont College in El Cajon in early 2015, but when his NCAA eligibility process became stalled, he transferred to the Monterrey Institute of Technology where he played college football on a full scholarship and won the ONEFA National Championship in 2019.

Professional career 

Gutiérrez was assigned to the San Francisco 49ers roster on May 4, 2021, as a part of the NFL's International Player Pathway Program (IPPP). He was waived by the 49ers on August 31, 2021, when the team announced its final 53-man roster for the 2021 season. He was resigned to the practice squad, due to an IPPP exemption allowing the 49ers to have an extra practice squad member, however, he was ineligible to be activated to the main roster.

On February 2, 2022, Gutiérrez was one of eleven players who signed a reserve/futures contract with the 49ers. He played in his first NFL game on August 20, 2022, during week 2 of the 2022 preseason in a 17–7 victory against the Minnesota Vikings. Head coach Kyle Shanahan awarded Gutiérrez the game ball to celebrate his NFL debut. He was waived on August 30, 2022, and signed to the practice squad the next day. He signed a reserve/future contract on January 31, 2023.

Personal life 
On September 26, 2022, one day before an international friendly match between the Mexico and Colombia national teams in Levi's Stadium, Gutiérrez was invited by the Mexico national team to trade jerseys with Mexican players Guillermo Ochoa and Andrés Guardado.

References

Further reading

External links 

 San Francisco 49ers bio

Living people
1995 births
San Francisco 49ers players
American football offensive tackles
Sportspeople from Tijuana
Mexican players of American football
International Player Pathway Program participants
Borregos Salvajes Monterrey players